Such a Charade is a 1953 West German comedy film directed by Erik Ode and starring Josefin Kipper,  Joachim Brennecke and Heli Finkenzeller.

Main cast
 Josefin Kipper as Sabine Keller
 Joachim Brennecke as Stefan Popp
 Heli Finkenzeller as Dorette Schilling
 Walter Gross as Muskat, Klavierstimmer
 Erika von Thellmann as Frau Droysen
 Carola Höhn as Fräulein Dr. Barioz
 Christiane Jansen as Fräulein Steen, Reporterin
 Maria Sebaldt as Elinor, Zimmermädchen
 Eva Rimski as Lilo Messner
 Franz-Otto Krüger as Gersdorf, Versicherungsagent
 Stanislav Ledinek as Kovacz
 Karl Hellmer as Neditsch
 Karin Evans as Fräulein Winterfeld
 Agnes Windeck as Frau Angelroth
 Rolf Weih as Dr. Usedom
 Paul Heidemann as Herr Angelroth
 Kurt Weitkamp as Mr. Cleaver
 Victor Janson as Gerichtsvollzieher
 Erwin Biegel as Austermann, Hausmeister
 Das Cornell-Trio as Singer

References

Bibliography 
 Bock, Hans-Michael & Bergfelder, Tim. The Concise CineGraph. Encyclopedia of German Cinema. Berghahn Books, 2009.

External links 
 

1953 films
1953 comedy films
German comedy films
West German films
1950s German-language films
Films directed by Erik Ode
German black-and-white films
1950s German films